Prince of Wolf is a 2016 Taiwanese romance television series created and produced by Sanlih E-Television. Starring Derek Chang, Amber An, Samuel Gu, Katie Chen and Hsueh Shih-ling as the main cast. Filming began on June 9, 2016 and wrapped up on 28 October 2016. First original broadcast began on July 3, 2016 on TTV airing every Sunday night at 10:00–11:30 pm.

Synopsis 
The story begins with Du Zhe Ming (Zhang Yu Zheng) walking between the forest in the deep woods and his parents are searching for him. While wandering he saves a female wolf from harm. Du Zhe Ming is waiting for his parents but due to heavy rains his parents couldn't find him and the officer claim him to be dead. Seeing Du Zhe Ming alone the Wolf King decides to take Zhe Ming into the wolf tribe. After some years a grown Du Zhe Ming (Derek Chang) is living among the wolves knows how to hunt and survive in the wild without forgetting his human traits. Tian Mi Mi (Amber An) is an amateur photographer who decides to go to Wolf Mountain to take pictures of the breathtaking landscape. When Tian Mi Mi falls into a valley, Zhe Ming saves her and takes her back to his cave. Fascinated by the first woman he has encountered, Zhe Ming is convinced that Mi Mi is his female wolf mate and is mesmerized by her. So, Zhe Ming decides to leave his wolf life behind to follow Mi Mi back into the human world with his wolf.

In the human world Zhe Ming starts living with Mi Mi and her family. Mi Mi teach him to live human life and even makes him join in her office. Mi Mi works in a company under Jian Hao Wei (Samuel Gu). He is an adopted son of Jiang Ping (John) and Wen Pei Yi (Mandy), they are the parents of Du Zhe Ming. Zhe Ming encounters Hao Wei showing his love interest towards Mi Mi which makes a love triangle fight between them. But Mi Mi falls in love with Zhe Ming due to his innocence.

Mandy buys a gift and celebrates Zhe Ming birthday as every year in memory of her son with the faith that he will return. Soon John finds out about Zhe Ming existence and tries to keep him away from his company and family as he is the real heir which he does not want Hao Wei to lose. He plots many chaos against Zhe Ming and makes him lead back to the forest. When Chen Shu Pei (Lin Min Chen) finds out the real identity of Zhe Ming, she reveals about it to Mandy. With Mi Mi they go to the wolf mountain to bring Zhe Ming back. After arriving back Zhe Ming started staying with his family and reveals to his father that he did not forget his sin back in the childhood where John knowingly leaves Zhe Ming in between the forest. Hao Wei becomes furious about Zhe Ming handling the company and receiving more love and faith from his grandfather. Zhe Ming arrange marriage is fixed with Chen Shu Pei which allows John to separate him from Mi Mi. But with the help of their friends they conquer all the misunderstanding between them. 
John's every chaos against Zhe Ming starts failing and Hao Wei too left him and started supporting Zhe Ming after knowing the real intention of his father. John kills Zhe Ming's wolf in the cave and plots a plan to kill Zhe Ming too with an accident to end his problem but fails it by harming Hao Wei. In the hospital John confess to Mandy and her father about all his sins and also reveals that Hao Wei is his own son with his love. Mandy is furious with him but Zhe Ming Forgives him.

Mi Mi and Zhe Ming got married but stays separately for her career and after completing her work she returns to Zhe Ming in the party. Chen Shu Pei and Hao Wei starts developing feelings for each other. In the end Zhe Ming and his son walks between the trees of the wolf mountain but soon he disappear while Zhe Ming was talking to Mi Mi in phone. When Mi Mi and Zhe Ming starts searching all over the forest they ends up finding their son and Zhe Ming's wolf alive.

Cast

Main cast
Derek Chang 杜軒睿 as Du Zhe Ming 杜澤明（Wolf）
Zhang Yu Zheng 張育誠 as childhood Zhe Ming
Amber An 安心亞 as Tian Mi Mi 田蜜蜜
 古斌 as Jian Hao Wei/Du Hao Wei 簡浩維/杜浩維
 陳語安 as Tian Zi Zi 田滋滋
Hsueh Shih-ling 薛仕凌 as Jiang Ping 江平（John）
 林明禎 as Chen Shu Pei 陳舒裴

Supporting cast
 陳博正 as Tian Min Gui 田閩貴
Yang Chieh-mei 楊潔玫 as Liu Mei Lian 劉美蓮
Yang Lie 楊烈 as Du Bai Quan 杜百全
 林煒 as Du Qi Hong 杜奇宏
 謝瓊煖 as Wen Pei Yi 溫佩儀（Mandy）
 王琄 as Mrs. Wu
Fish Lin 鲶魚哥 as Huang Shen Nong 黃神農
Huang Zi Wen 匡自文 as Li Shi Zhen 李時真

Cameos
 蕭景鴻 as huntsman
 ?? as Jia Hong 家宏
 李國超 as Mr. Zhang
 黃錦雯 as Mrs. Zhang
?? as Zhang Xiao Bao 張小寶
Zhong Lun Li 鍾倫理 as Old Wang 老王
?? as Maggie
Lin Jing Zhe 林靖哲 as David
Wu Jia Wei 吳珈瑋 as Lucy
 梁家榕 as Jian Mei Hui 簡美惠
 劉紀範 as Penny
Akio Chen 陳慕義 as Xu Guo Long 許國隆
Su Yi Jing 蘇意菁 as Su Li Fang 蘇麗芳
?? as Xu Xiao Zhi 許小志
 高盟傑 as Scrivener Li
Zhu Yong De 朱永德 as Doctor Zhu
 陳玉玫 as Lisa
Jessica Hsu 許妍庭 as Xue Sheng

Soundtrack
Love Magic 愛戀魔法 by Bii 畢書盡
Stars 滿天星 by Dino Lee 李玉璽
Funky Boy by Bii 畢書盡
I Will Miss You by Bii 畢書盡
Sweet Little Baby by Bii 畢書盡
Kiss Me by Amber An 安心亞
Magnifier 放大鏡 by Amber An 安心亞
Friends 朋友 by Wakin Chau 周華健
Lucy Bear 玩具熊 by Dino Lee 李玉璽

Broadcast

Episode ratings
Competing dramas on rival channels airing at the same time slot were:
CTV – Nie Xiaoqian, Uncontrollably Fond, Jealousy Incarnate
FTV – The King of Drama

: The average rating calculation does not include special episode.

Awards and nominations

References

External links
Prince of Wolf TTV Website  
Prince of Wolf SETTV Website 
 

2016 Taiwanese television series debuts
2016 Taiwanese television series endings
Taiwan Television original programming
Sanlih E-Television original programming